Carlos Llano Cifuentes (México City, February 17, 1932 – Miami, May 5, 2010) was a Mexican philosopher and university professor, as well as one of the founding members of IPADE Business School and founder of Universidad Panamericana.

Early life and education
He received his BA and PhD in Philosophy from the Complutense University of Madrid, the University of Saint Thomas in Rome (Angelicum), and the National Autonomous University of Mexico (UNAM), while also studying Economics in the Complutense University.

Career
In 1958, Llano launched ISTMO magazine, which publishes articles about humanist thought and ideas about society. In 1967, he founded the IPADE Business School, which has been ranked among the top 10 Business Schools in the world by Forbes magazine and the Financial Times. He also founded the Universidad Panamericana in 1967, which now has three campuses in Mexico — Mexico City, Guadalajara, and Aguascalientes — and is ranked as a top-tier Mexican university.

Llano wrote many books and papers on the topic of philosophy and business, especially on the anthropology of management action.

Works
 Ensayos sobre José Gaos: metafísica y fenomenología. Instituto de Investigaciones Filosóficas-UNAM, México, 2008.
 Análisis de la acción directiva. Editorial Limusa. México, 1979 (15ª reimpresión, 2007).
 Humildad y liderazgo, Ediciones Ruz, México, 2004.
 Falacias y ámbitos de la creatividad, Noriega Editores-IPADE, México, 2002.
 La metamorfosis de las empresas, Granica, 2001.
 La amistad en la empresa. F.C.E., México, 2000.
 Examen filosófico del acto de la decisión. Editorial Cruz, México, 1999.
 La formación de la inteligencia, la voluntad y el carácter. Editorial Trillas, México, 1999.
 Dilemas éticos de la empresa contemporánea. Fondo de Cultura Económica. México, 1998.
 La enseñanza de la dirección y el método del caso. IPADE. México, 1996.
 La creación del empleo. Editorial Panorama. México, 1995.
 El nuevo empresario en México. Fondo de Cultura Económica. México, 1995.
 El postmodernismo en la empresa. Editorial McGraw-Hill. México, 1994.
 El empresario y su mundo. Editorial McGraw-Hill. México, 1991.
 El empresario y su acción. Editorial McGraw-Hill. México, 1991.
 El empresario ante la responsabilidad y la motivación. Editorial McGraw-Hill. México, 1991.

References

Cronología de Carlos Llano Cifuentes
Noticia de su fallecimiento (CNN)
Nahum de la Vega Morell. Carlos Llano en Resumen, Ediciones Ruz. México, 2009
Óscar Jiménez. Epítome de la Filosofía de Carlos Llano, Editorial Ruz. México, 2010

External links

Google Scholar report

Mexican philosophers
Opus Dei members
1932 births
2010 deaths